Japonia shigetai is a species of land snail with opercula, terrestrial gastropods in the family Cyclophoridae. This species is endemic to Japan.

References

Molluscs of Japan
Cyclophoridae
Gastropods described in 1985
Taxonomy articles created by Polbot